A Representation up to homotopy has several meanings. One of the earliest appeared in the `physical' context of constrained Hamiltonian systems. The essential idea is lifting a non-representation on a quotient to a representation up to strong homotopy on a resolution of the quotient.
As a concept in differential geometry, it generalizes the notion of representation of a Lie algebra to Lie algebroids and nontrivial vector bundles. As such, it was introduced by Abad and Crainic. 

As a motivation consider a regular Lie algebroid (A,ρ,[.,.]) (regular meaning that the anchor ρ has constant rank) where we have two natural A-connections on g(A) = ker ρ and ν(A)= TM/im ρ respectively:

In the deformation theory of the Lie algebroid A there is a long exact sequence

This suggests that the correct cohomology for the deformations (here denoted as Hdef) comes from the direct sum of the two modules g(A) and ν(A) and should be called adjoint representation. Note however that in the more general case where ρ does not have constant rank we cannot easily define the representations g(A) and ν(A). Instead we should consider the 2-term complex A→TM and a representation on it. This leads to the notion explained here.

Definition 
Let (A,ρ,[.,.]) be a Lie algebroid over a smooth manifold M and let Ω(A) denote its Lie algebroid complex. Let further E be a ℤ-graded vector bundle over M and Ω(A,E) = Ω(A) ⊗ Γ(E) be its ℤ-graded A-cochains with values in E. A representation up to homotopy of A on E is a differential operator D that maps

fulfills the Leibniz rule

and squares to zero, i.e. D2 = 0.

Homotopy operators 
A representation up to homotopy as introduced above is equivalent to the following data
 a degree 1 operator ∂: E → E that squares to 0,
 an End(E)-valued A-2-form ω2 of total degree 1, such that the curvature fulfills 
 End(E)-valued A-p-forms ωp of total degree 1 that fulfill the homotopy relations….

The correspondence is characterized as

Homomorphisms 
A homomorphism between representations up to homotopy (E,DE) and (F,DF) of the same Lie algebroid A is a degree 0 map Φ:Ω(A,E) → Ω(A,F) that commutes with the differentials, i.e.

An isomorphism is now an invertible homomorphism.
We denote Rep∞ the category of equivalence classes of representations up to homotopy together with equivalence classes of homomorphisms.

In the sense of the above decomposition of D into a cochain map ∂, a connection ∇, and higher homotopies, we can also decompose the Φ as Φ0 + Φ1 + … with

and then the compatibility condition reads

Examples 
Examples are usual representations of Lie algebroids or more specifically Lie algebras, i.e. modules.

Another example is given by a p-form ωp together with E = M × ℝ[0] ⊕ ℝ[p] and the operator D = ∇ + ωp where ∇ is the flat connection on the trivial bundle M × ℝ.

Given a representation up to homotopy as D = ∂ + ∇ + ω2 + … we can construct a new representation up to homotopy by conjugation, i.e.
 D''' = ∂ − ∇ + ω2 − ω3 + −….

 Adjoint representation 
Given a Lie algebroid (A,ρ,[.,.]) together with a connection ∇ on its vector bundle we can define two associated A-connections as follows

Moreover, we can introduce the mixed curvature as

This curvature measures the compatibility of the Lie bracket with the connection and is one of the two conditions of A together with TM forming a matched pair of Lie algebroids.

The first observation is that this term decorated with the anchor map ρ, accordingly, expresses the curvature of both connections ∇bas.  Secondly we can match up all three ingredients to a representation up to homotopy as:

Another observation is that the resulting representation up to homotopy is independent of the chosen connection ∇, basically because the difference between two A-connections is an (A − 1 -form with values in End(E'').

References 

Representation theory of Lie algebras
Differential geometry